Henri Duparc (December 23, 1941, in Forécariah – April 18, 2006, in Paris) was an Ivorian film director and writer. He produced and wrote the 2004 film Caramel.

Filmography
 1969: Mouna, le rêve d'un artiste
 1972: The Family (original title Abusuan) – It won special mention in Panafrican Film and Television Festival of Ouagadougou in 1973.
 1973: Les racines de la vie (short)
 1977: Wild Grass – L'Herbe sauvage
 1986: Aya
 1987: I've chosen life – (original title J'ai choisi de vivre)
 1988: Dancing in the Dust with Bakary Bamba, Naky Sy Savane
 1990: Le Sixième doigt with Patrick Chesnais, Jean Carmet, Bakary Bamba, Naky Sy Savane
 1992: Joli Cœur
 1994: Rue Princesse with Félicité Wouassi
 1997: Une couleur café
 2004: Caramel

As an actor
1968 : Concerto for an Exile – (original title: Concerto pour un exil)

External links
 

1941 births
2006 deaths
Ivorian film directors
People from Kindia Region